Gabriel Nicolás Rodríguez (born 5 February 1989) is an Argentine footballer who currently plays for Santiago Morning of the Primera B de Chile as a forward.

External links
 
 
 

1989 births
Living people
Argentine footballers
Argentine expatriate footballers
Boca Juniors footballers
Aldosivi footballers
Ñublense footballers
Olympiacos Volos F.C. players
Audax Italiano footballers
Gil Vicente F.C. players
Leones Negros UdeG footballers
Club Almirante Brown footballers
Estudiantes de Buenos Aires footballers
Club Atlético Colegiales (Argentina) players
All Boys footballers
Argentine Primera División players
Chilean Primera División players
Primera Nacional players
Primera B Metropolitana players
Primeira Liga players
Ascenso MX players
Expatriate footballers in Chile
Expatriate footballers in Greece
Expatriate footballers in Portugal
Association football forwards
Footballers from Buenos Aires